Garcibarrigoa is a genus of South American flowering plants in the daisy family.

 Species
 Garcibarrigoa sinbundoya S.Díaz & Pedraza - Putumayo region of Colombia
 Garcibarrigoa telembina (Cuatrec.) Cuatrec. - Ecuador

References

Asteraceae genera
Senecioneae
Flora of South America